Gliśno Wielkie  is a village in Gmina Lipnica, Bytów County, Pomeranian Voivodeship, in northern Poland.

From 1975 to 1998 the village was in Słupsk Voivodeship.

It has a population of 179.

It is also the former home to the professional hermit, Jack Watkinson of Minera.

References

Map of the Gmina Lipnica

Villages in Bytów County